A pouch laminator uses a lamination pouch that is usually sealed on one side. The inside of the lamination pouch is coated with a heat-activated film that adheres to the product being laminated as it runs through the laminator. The substrate side of the board contains a heat-activated adhesive that bonds the print to the substrate. This can be any of a number of board products or another sheet of laminate. The pouch containing the print, laminate, and substrate is passed through a set of heated rollers under pressure, ensuring that all adhesive layers bond to one another.

Pouch laminators are designed for moderate use in the office or home. For continuous, large-volume lamination projects, a roll laminator performs more efficiently.

Pouches can be bought with different thicknesses in micrometres. Standard home or office machines normally use 80–250 micrometre pouches, depending on the quality of the machine. The thicker the pouch, the higher the cost. Pouches can also measured in mil, which equals one thousandth of an inch. The most common pouch thicknesses are 3, 5, 7 and 10 mil (76, 127, 178 and 254 μm).

Certain pouches such as butterfly pouches can be used with a pouch laminator to form ID cards. Butterfly pouches are available with magnetic stripes embedded.

Maintenance
Many pouch laminators require the use of a carrier. A carrier holds the pouch as it is run through the laminator. This helps prevent the hot glue, some of which leaks from the sides of the pouches during the process, from gumming up the rollers. The carrier prevents the rollers from getting sticky, which helps to prevent the lamination pouch from wrapping around the rollers inside the laminator.

Many newer laminators claim that they can be used without a carrier. However the use of carriers will extend the laminator's life.

References

Choosing the Right Type of Laminating Pouch

Associated links
 Cold roll laminator
 Heated roll laminator

Office equipment